"COLORS" is FLOW's eleventh single. The A-Side was used as the first opening theme song for Code Geass. It reached #2 on the Oricon charts in its first week and charted for 16 weeks.

Track listing

Cover version
Cover by fictional rock band Afterglow (CV. Ayane Sakura) was added as a playable song in the smartphone rhythm game BanG Dream! Girls Band Party! on December 11, 2021, featured FLOW as a guest performer.

References

Flow (band) songs
2006 singles
2006 songs
Code Geass
Ki/oon Music singles
Song articles with missing songwriters